My Kind of People was an ITV television show presented by British entertainer Michael Barrymore broadcast from 26 October to 26 December 1995.

Format
Barrymore travelled around the country in his customised sports car visiting shopping centres, where amateurs performed on a stage for the programme unrehearsed. Some acts were simply shown performing together with the audience reaction, whereas others were interviewed by Barrymore or shown interspersed with footage of Barrymore to the side of the stage engaged in foolish behaviour in order to get reactions from the audience. Often, Barrymore would join the act on stage and continue the tomfoolery.

Notable performers
Susan Boyle performed on the show, 13 years before she became famous worldwide for her Britain's Got Talent audition. Barrymore mocked her as she performed "I Don't Know How to Love Him" from Jesus Christ Superstar at the Olympia Mall in East Kilbride, lying on the stage beneath her and pretending to look up her skirt as she performed, attempting to sing with her during the end of the song and then staging a kiss with her.

References

External links
 My Kind of People at BFI.
 .

1995 British television series debuts
1995 British television series endings
1990s British comedy television series
ITV comedy
London Weekend Television shows
Television series by ITV Studios
English-language television shows
Michael Barrymore